Cho Hyun-chul is a South Korean actor. He gained recognition for his roles in the television series Hotel del Luna (2019), D.P. (2021), Inspector Koo (2021), as well as the films The First Lap (2017) and Samjin Company English Class (2020).

Filmography

Film

Television

Awards and nominations

References

External links 
 
 
 

1986 births
Living people
South Korean male television actors
South Korean male film actors
South Korean film directors
South Korean male web series actors
Male actors from Seoul
21st-century South Korean male actors
Korea National University of Arts alumni